Zakaria Abdulla (Kurdish: Zekerîya) is an Iraqi Kurdish musician. He is best known for his pop music, which combines Kurdish melodies with various popular regional music styles.

Personal life
Zakaria Abdulla, was born in Hêwler, Kurdistan, into a musical family which meant even from early childhood, he was interested in music. He left his homeland in the 1990s migrating to a number of European countries before finally settling in Sweden.

Career
He is regarded as an innovative artist who revolutionized Kurdish music. Breaking away from conventional 2-beat march-like rhythms used traditionally in Kurdish music, Zakaria began blending other genres and regional influences, defining a new style of modern Kurdish popular music. Zakaria has an established millennial fan base, but his music appeals to people of all ages.

1998–2003
In 1998, his first album To Hatî (trans: "You Came") was well received by Kurdish audiences worldwide. It was recorded with the help of a popular Swedish musician. To Hatî was the lead single from the project and the music video released was the first of his career.

Late on 1999, he released his second album Bigerêwe (trans: "Come Back"), with some Kurdish musicians in Sweden. Bigerêwe was released as a single from the album and a music video which was filmed in Sweden accompanied it

In 2001 he released his third album Daye (trans: "Mom"), which comprised a mix of Fantezi and pop music. The music videos for the tracks Daye and Boçî hatî (trans: "Why Did You Come?") were shot in Arbil.

In 2002, Zakaria released his silver album Rojgar (trans: "Days"), selling more than 1,500,000 copies. The album was recorded in Turkey. In this project, Zakaria utilized the regional musical influence known as Fantasia style. The hit video track from this album, Netbînim (trans: "If I Don't See You") was shot in Istanbul, which was followed by another music video for the song Rojgar. The last video from this album was the kurdish dance hit Tu naza neke shot in Diyarbakir.

2004–present
His next album Têlinaz (trans: "Lovely"), released in October 2004, sold more than 3 million copies worldwide, introducing him to non-Kurdish audiences. Têlinaz was recorded in Turkey, and comprised a mix of Fantezi and Pop music. The video for the lead single Têlinaz was shot in Istanbul with a number of dancers and was also broadcast on Turkish television.

January 2007, Zakaria released his sixth album, titled Gencî Pîr (trans.: "Old youth") consisting of 12 songs. The album was largely a work of Fantezi complemented with pop music and R&B.  The song Roji Bextim became a successful R&B hit. Zakaria shot a music video for this album in Istanbul and Cappadocia, called Gullê (trans: "Rose"), with an Italian model, playing the lead love interest. The video was released on 25 December of that year.

5 October 2008, Zakaria received the invitation to perform at the Re:orient festival in Sweden. To honour this invitation, he brought over 22 professional musicians from Kurdistan for the event. This was a first, for a Kurdish artist to request the company of such a large group of fellow musicians to come to Europe from Kurdistan. The concert took place in Stockholm Concert House and the performance was overall well received and was noted in Swedish media as a success.

In November 2008 he receives the "Medal of honor" (Gold medal), and was acknowledged amongst Iraq’s and Kurdistan’s greatest artists. This was to commend his career and commemorate him as an artist who raised Kurdish music to whole new dimension. There was a great number of attendees present at the ceremony which was broadcast live on 8 different Kurdish and Arabic channels.

7 April 2010 Zakaria released his latest album to date titled "Laperrey Spî" (White Page), consisting of 14 tracks. All the benefits generated from the album was to be donated to organisations helping orphaned and impoverished children, especially those who are victims of war and through no fault of their own, deprived of education and schooling.

Discography
To Hatî (You came) – (January 1998)
 01. To Hatî (You came)
 02. Xanimê Xanimê (Lady Lady)
 03. Amînê (a kurdish female name)
 04. Nemzanî (I didn't know)
 05. Were Lam (Come to me)
 06. Laye Laye & Lanek (Lullaby)

Bigerêwe (Come back) – (November 1999)
 01. Bigerêwe (Come back)
 02. Serçopî (A Kurdish type of dance)
 03. Kîje Hewlêrî (Hewlêr's girl)
 04. Çende Cwanî! (You're so beautiful!)
 05. Xeletandit Em Dile (You deceived my heart)
 06. Emanê (A kurdish type of singing)
 07. Wele Te Nagirim (Hey, I don't mind)
 08. Nazanim Çon Xoşimwîstî (I don't know how I loved you)
 09. Hewrî Dildarî (Cloud of love)

Daye (Mom) – (January 2001)
 01. Daye (Mom)
 02. Bew Bew (Come come)
 03. Rêbwar (Traveller)
 04. Azîz Wanabê (Not in this way darling)
 05. Agir Ketiye Dilê Min (My heart is on fire)
 06. Naze (Spoilt)
 07. Gulî Genim (Cornflower)
 08. Gulfiroş (Florist)
 09. Her Yadit Mawe (Your memory still here)
 10. Ha Gullê (Here rose)
 11. Boçî Hatî? (Why did you came back?)
 12. Durî To (Your far)

Rojgar (Days) – (May 2002)
 01. Rojgar (Days)
 02. Netbînim (If I don't see you)
 03. Boçî? (Why?)
 04. Dîlana (It's party)
 05. Helperkê (Dance)
 06. Beserhatî (Occurrence)
 07. Suham (AKurdish female name)
 08. Yaran (Lovers)
 09. Gullala (Flowers)
 10. Tu Naza Neke (Don't be spoilt)
 11. Werewe (Come back)
 12. Gullê (Rose)
 13. Sallana (Little by little)
 14. Takey? (Until when?)

Têlînaz (Lovely) – (October 2004)
01. Bo Peşimani? (Why are you regretful?)
02. Têlînaz (Lovely)
03. Jiyan Bê Tu (Life without you)
04. Şahjina Rojhilatê (Queen of east)
05. Le Dudilit Wazbêne (Don't be 2 hearted)
06. Were Esmer (Come brunette)
07. Çon Wanabê? (How it's not going to be this way?)
08. Warê Min (My land)
09. Tom Nawê (Don't want you)
10. Meylî Wilat (Inclination of country)
11. Were Saqî (come on barmaid)
12. Agirî îşq (Fire of love)
13. Were Semaye (Come to the dance)
14. Şivanê Garê (Shepherd of Garê)
15. Sergerdanî (Lonely)

Gencî Pîr (Old Youth) – (January 2007)
01. Direng Hatî (You came too late)
02. Gullê (Rose)
03. Kîjê Nekey (Don't do that girl)
04. Min Tu Navê (I Don't want you)
05. Gencî Pîr (Old youth)
06. Tom Dewê (I want you)
07. Carê Dill Dedey (one time you give your heart)
08. Rojî Bextim (My lucky day)
09. Bo Min Be (Be mine)
10. Derdê Te (Your pain)
11. îşqit (Your love)
12. Çon Dillit Dê (How can you?)

Laperrey Spî (White page) – (7 April 2010)
01. Qeder (Fate)
02. Maç (Kiss)
03. Nîgay Pirrgo (A Seductive Glance)
04. Le Gell To (With you)
05. Canam (My Soul)
06. Bedil Hîştim (Heartless Abandoned)
07. Le Meyxane (At the bar)
08. Çawerrêtim (Waiting for you)
09. Tenyayî (Loneliness)
10. Rojanî Xoşewîstî (Love days)
11. Bêytewe (When You Are Back)
12. Ewîn Wa niye (Love Is Not Like That)
13. Çansêkî Tir (One More Chance)
14. Bo Kurdistan (For Kurdistan)

See also
 Kurdish music
 Kurdish people
 List of Kurdish musical artists

External links
 Official website
 Zakaria Music Radio
 Kurdnetwork Official Page

Living people
Kurdish male singers
Year of birth missing (living people)